You Got It All may refer to:
"You Got It All" (The Jets song), 1986
"You Got It All" (Union J song), 2014
You Got It All – The Album, a 2014 album by Union J on which the above song is included